Vaishampayana is the traditional narrator of the Mahabharata, one of the two major Sanskrit epics of India.

Legend 
Vaishampayana is a renowned sage who is stated to be the original teacher of the Krishna Yajur-Veda:

The Ashvalayana Grihya Sutra mentions him as Mahabharatacharya. He is also mentioned in the Taittiriya Aranayaka and the Ashtadhyayi of Pāṇini.

Vyasa is regarded to have taught the Mahabharata of 100,000 verses to Vaishampayana. He is regarded to have recited the epic to King Janamejaya at his sarpa satra (snake sacrifice) The Harivamsha Purana is also recited by him, where he narrates the legend of Prithu's emergence from Vena.

Reference

Further reading
Dowson's Classical Dictionary of Hindu Mythology

Characters in the Mahabharata
Rishis